Steve Darcis was the defending champion but decided not to participate.

Daniel Muñoz-de la Nava won this tournament, beating Nicolás Pastor 6–4, 2–6, 6–2 in the final.

Seeds

Draw

Finals

Top half

Bottom half

References
 Main Draw
 Qualifying Draw

Internazionali di Tennis del Friuli Venezia Giulia
Zucchetti Kos Tennis Cup - Singles
Zucchetti